George Wilson may refer to:

Arts and entertainment
 George Balch Wilson (born 1927), American composer, professor emeritus at the University of Michigan
 George Washington Wilson (1823–1893), Scottish photographer
 George Christopher (actor) (George Wilson, born 1970), British actor

Law and politics
 George Wilson (Chief Colonial Secretary of Uganda), 1862–1943, colonial administrator in Uganda
 George Wilson (reformer) (1808–1870), English political activist, known as chairman of the Anti-Cornlaw League
 George A. Wilson (1884–1953), United States Senator and Governor of Iowa
 George Grafton Wilson (1863–1951), distinguished professor of international law
 George H. Wilson (1905–1985), member of the United States House of Representatives
 George M. Wilson (1913–?), politician in Newfoundland, Canada
 George W. Wilson (politician) (1840–1909), member of the United States House of Representatives
 George W. Wilson (IRS commissioner) (1843–1900), Commissioner of Internal Revenue, 1899-1900
 George Wilson (mayor) (1816–1902), mayor of Pittsburgh
 George P. Wilson (1840–1920), Minnesota lawyer and politician
 George Wilson (Australian politician) (1895–1942), member of the New South Wales Legislative Assembly
 George Henry Wilson (1893–1988), Canadian politician

Military
 George Wilson (Royal Navy officer) (1756–1826), naval officer
 George Wilson (major) (1836–1897), German-American Union Army officer
 George Wilson (VC) (1886–1926), Scottish recipient of the Victoria Cross

Science and engineering

 George Wilson (chemist) (1818–1859), Regius Professor of Technology at the University of Edinburgh
 George Ambler Wilson (1906–1977), British civil engineer
 George Fergusson Wilson (1822–1902), English industrial chemist

Sports

American football
 George Wilson (safety) (born 1981), American football player
 George Wilson (American football coach) (1914–1978), professional football player and coach
 George Wilson (American football halfback) (1905–1990), American football halfback at Lafayette College, College Football Hall of Fame inductee, World War II U.S. Marine general
 George Wilson (quarterback) (1943–2011), American football player
 Wildcat Wilson (George Wilson, 1901–1963), American football player for the University of Washington and the Los Angeles Wildcats of the first American Football League

Baseball
 George Wilson (outfielder) (1925–1975), American professional baseball outfielder
 George Wilson (pitcher) (1875–1915), American baseball pitcher, Negro leagues career 1895–1905
 George F. Wilson (1889–1967), American professional baseball catcher

Basketball
 George Wilson (basketball, born 1942), retired American professional basketball player
 George Wilson (American football coach) (1914–1978), American professional basketball player

Association football
 George Wilson (footballer, born 1883) (1883–1960), Scottish footballer (Newcastle, Hearts, Everton, Scotland)
 George Wilson (footballer, born 1887) (1887–1970), Scottish footballer (Aberdeen)
 George Wilson (footballer, born 1892) (1892–1961), English footballer (Blackpool, Sheffield Wednesday, Nelson)
 George Wilson (footballer, born 1905) (1905–1984), Scottish footballer (Clydebank, Leeds United)
 George Wilson (footballer, born 1912) English football goalkeeper (Ayr United, York City)

Cricket
 George Alfred Wilson (1877–1962), English cricketer, played for Worcestershire 1899–1906
 George Wilson (New Zealand cricketer) (George Charles Lee Wilson, 1887–1917), New Zealand cricketer
 George Clifford Wilson (1902–1957), English cricketer, played for Worcestershire 1924–26, son of George Alfred Wilson
 Billy Wilson (cricketer) (George Lindsay Wilson, 1868–1920), Australian cricketer,  played for Sussex 1887–95 and Victoria 1898–99
 George Wilson (Yorkshire cricketer) (George Arthur Wilson, 1916–2002), English first class cricketer, played for Yorkshire 1936–39
 George Wilson (Irish cricketer) (1916–1995), Irish cricketer

Other sports
 George Wilson (Australian footballer) (1920–2014), Australian footballer for Collingwood and St Kilda
 George Wilson (rugby), rugby union, and rugby league player of the 1940s and 1950s
 George Wilson (rugby league) (born 1975), Australian rugby league player
 George Wilson (rugby union) (1866-1908), Scottish rugby union player
 George Wilson (racewalker) (1766–1839), Newcastle born competitive walker
 George Wilson (bowls) (1903–?), South African lawn bowler

Other
 George Wilson of Glenluce (1823–1899), Scottish archaeologist
 George Everett Wilson, fictional character in the comic strip Dennis the Menace
 George Wilson (Coronation Street), fictional character in the British soap opera Coronation Street
 George Wilson (The Great Gatsby), fictional character in the novel The Great Gatsby
 George Wilson (businessman) (1869–1939), New Zealand philanthropist knighted in the 1934 Birthday Honours
 George Wilson, convicted of robbing the US Mail and sentenced to death, subject of United States v. Wilson

See also
 Georges Wilson (1921–2010), French film and TV actor